Dirck Dircksz van Santvoort (bapt. 16 December 1609 – bur. 9 March 1680) was a Dutch Golden Age painter.

Biography
Santvoort was born and died in Amsterdam, where he married in 1648 and had a son named Rembrandt. He married a second time in 1657. Though not registered as a Rembrandt pupil, he is considered a member of Rembrandt's school of painting, creating portraits and historical allegories.

He was the brother of the landscape painter Pieter Dircksz Santvoort.

Known works
 Regentesses of the Spinhuis, 1638

References

External links

Dirck Dircksz. van Santvoort on Artnet
 Works and literature at PubHist

1609 births
1680 deaths
Painters from Amsterdam
Dutch Golden Age painters
Dutch male painters